Hervey McDowell McClellan (December 22, 1894 – November 6, 1925) was an American Major League Baseball infielder.

McClellan started his professional baseball career in 1914. He played two years for the Lexington Colts of the Ohio State League, hitting below .200 both years. Many reporters of the era mistakenly called him Harvey. 

McClellan joined the Chicago White Sox in 1919. He sat on the bench during the next few years but got more playing time when the team's stars were suspended in the Black Sox Scandal. In 1922, he was playing third base in a charity exhibition pitting all-star players from the New England and American Leagues against the Boston Red Sox and in the fourth inning pitched a ball to first baseman Elizabeth "Lizzie" Murphy. The historical game was the first time a woman had played against major league players. He was the starting shortstop for one season, 1923.

In 1925, McClellan died in his hometown after a five-month-long illness.

References

External links

1894 births
1925 deaths
People from Cynthiana, Kentucky
Major League Baseball infielders
Baseball players from Kentucky
Chicago White Sox players
Lexington Colts players